Gelephu Gewog (Dzongkha: དགེ་ལེགས་ཕུ་) is a gewog (village block) of Sarpang District, Bhutan. Gelephu Gewog, together with Serzhong, Taklai, and Bhur Gewogs, belongs to Gelephu Dungkhag.

References 

Gewogs of Bhutan
Sarpang District